Henan Faria da Silveira (born 3 April 1987) is a Brazilian footballer who plays as a forward for Criciúma, on loan from Vila Nova.

References

External links

Brazilian footballers
K League 1 players
K League 2 players
Campeonato Brasileiro Série B players
Campeonato Brasileiro Série C players
1987 births
Living people
Red Bull Brasil players
Clube Atlético Bragantino players
Club Athletico Paranaense players
Comercial Futebol Clube (Ribeirão Preto) players
Jeonnam Dragons players
São Bernardo Futebol Clube players
Gangwon FC players
Jeju United FC players
Esporte Clube Santo André players
Figueirense FC players
Esporte Clube São Bento players
Botafogo Futebol Clube (SP) players
Association football forwards
Footballers from São Paulo